Sheila Nazarian is an Iranian-American plastic surgeon and television personality. She is the best known as the host of Netflix reality television series Skin Decision: Before and After. She has also guest starred  on television series such as The Real Housewives of Beverly Hills, Basketball Wives, and Revenge Body with Khloe Kardashian.

Early life and education 
Nazarian was born in New York to a Jewish family from Iran. Her family had returned to Iran, during the 1979 Islamic Revolution, but they could no longer leave and at age 6 she was smuggled out of Iran into Pakistan along with her mother and eventually moved to Los Angeles.

She attended Columbia University, earning a BA in economics with a pre-medical concentration. She initially pursued a career in orthopedics before deciding to study plastic surgery. After graduation, she attended Yeshiva University’s Albert Einstein College of Medicine and later went on to a cosmetic and reconstructive surgery residency at the University of Southern California. While at USC, she also received a Master of Medical Management (MMM) from the Marshall School of Business.

Career 
Nazarian went on to found her private practice, Nazarian Plastic Surgery, and a medical spa company, Spa 26. She also founded The Skin Spot, a line of skincare products and The Nazarian Institute, a non-profit organization that offers business and medical education to medical professionals.

Nazarian has starred as a special guest on the daytime talk shows The Doctors and The Real, as well as the PragerU web series Stories of Us in 2022. She has also guest starred in reality series such as The Real Housewives of Beverly Hills, and Revenge Body with Khloe Kardashian. She has also appeared on news programs such as Inside Edition,] Extra, The Insider, KGNS News, JBS News, 50’inside, and E! News.

In 2020, Nazarian began starring in Skin Decision: Before and After alongside nurse Jamie Sherill. The series was nominated for the Daytime Emmy Award for “Outstanding Lifestyle Series” in 2021.

Awards and honors 
Nazarian has earned multiple awards and honors throughout her career, including:

 2015-2017, Super Doctors, Southern California Rising Stars
 2016, Iranian Jewish Women's Organization Woman of the Year (Shamsi Hekmat Achievement Award)
 2018-2022, Super Doctors, Southern California Super Doctors
 2018, Top 2 Plastic Surgeon in Los Angeles by Locale Magazine
 2018, Inaugural Aesthetic Industry Awards, winner of Social Media Authority Award
 2019, Aesthetic Everything Award, winner of Diamond Crystal Award 
 2022, America's Best Plastic Surgeons by Newsweek

Activism 
Nazarian is an outspoken activist for Israel and Jewish causes. In response to the 2021 Israel-Palestine Crisis, she spoke out against antisemitism online.

Family 
Sheila Nazarian is married to Fardad Mobin, a neurosurgeon. The pair have three children  and reside in Bel Air, Los Angeles, California.

Television Appearances

References 

American women television personalities
Living people
21st-century American businesspeople
Businesspeople from Los Angeles
Participants in American reality television series
21st-century American businesswomen
Year of birth missing (living people)
American plastic surgeons
American physicians
American people of Iranian descent
Jewish American activists